The Estadio Mobil Super (popularly known as Palacio Sultán) is a baseball stadium in Monterrey, Mexico. It is the home venue of the Sultanes Monterrey Mexican League baseball team. It holds 21,803 people, making it the largest baseball stadium in Mexico and the third-largest in Latin America.

Location
The stadium is located meters away from the Estadio Universitario, the AFAIM stadium (a football stadium), the Niños Heroes Park, and the Niños Heroes Metro station, and not far from the Plaza de Toros Monumental Monterrey "Lorenzo Garza" (Bullring).

The stadium was inaugurated in games starting on 13 July 1990 when Monterrey played host to the World Youth Baseball Championship (for players 16 years old and under). The first LMB game was held on 20 July 1990 when the Sultanes defeated the Tecolotes de Nuevo Laredo in 12 innings.

In 1991 it hosted some preliminary games during the Pan American Games, although the baseball final series between host Cuba and Puerto Rico was held at Estadio Latinoamericano in Havana.

American pop-star Michael Jackson planned to perform here in November 1993 as part of his Dangerous World Tour, but the concert was canceled due to Jackson's illness.

Major League Baseball
In August 1996, it hosted a three-game series between the National League's San Diego Padres and New York Mets, marking the first time Major League Baseball was played in Mexico. It was also the site of an Opening Day game between the Colorado Rockies and San Diego Padres in April 1999. The San Diego Padres and defending National League champion Los Angeles Dodgers played at the stadium for a three-game series from 4–6 May 2018. In preparation for that series, the stadium underwent a $5.2 million facelift, which included the installation of new artificial turf, and instant on/off LED stadium lighting. Four Dodger pitchers combined to throw a no-hitter in the series opener on 4 May 2018. For the 2019 MLB Season, the stadium hosted 3 two-game series in the stadium. First, the Diamondbacks and Rockies played two Spring Training matchups in Monterrey. Afterward, the Cincinnati Reds and St. Louis Cardinals played two regular-season games in April 2019. Finally, on 4 May and 5 May 2019 the Houston Astros played the Los Angeles Angels.

Concerts
The stadium has also hosted other events such as concerts. Some artists that have played at the stadium are Maná, the late Selena, Justin Bieber and Guns N' Roses

References 

Monterrey
Sports venues in Monterrey
Sports venues completed in 1990
Mexican League ballparks